Without Regret is the first major-label (and second overall) album from American Idol season two seventh place finalist, Kimberly Caldwell. The album was released on April 19, 2011.

Background 
Caldwell signed a record deal with Vanguard Records and Capitol Records, and her debut album Without Regret was scheduled to be released on April 6, 2010, but was delayed to a July 2010 release date due to the addition of three new songs: the single "Desperate Girls & Stupid Boys", "Naked" and "Hotter Without You", which replaced the songs "Cost of Love", "When I'm Not Around" and "Sleep While I Drive".

In December 2009, she released her first single "Mess of You" and in December 2010 she released "Desperate Girls & Stupid Boys". The video for "Desperate Girls & Stupid Boys" premiered on January 18, 2011 on VEVO.

Without Regret was delayed again to December 31 and after a fourth delay, the album was finally released on April 19, 2011, over a year after the original release date.

Release and reception 
After the album was released, it charted at number seven on Billboards Top Heatseekers chart, selling 3,000 copies in its debut week.

The album received negative reviews. AllMusic critic Stephen Thomas Erlewine gave a rating of 2.5 out of 5 stars, writing: "Without Regret is designed as a reminder – a full-blown, air-brushed, impeccably manicured collection of power ballads and updated arena rock designed to showcase Caldwell's strut. Frequently, all these machinations just wind up playing like a straitjacketed, tempered-down Kelly Clarkson, retaining the oversized production but lacking the gargantuan hooks or personality, for that matter." Jonathan Keefe of Slant Magazine gave the album's rating a 1.5 out of 5 stars, writing: "Something that Caldwell struggled with during her time on American Idol was with song selections, and Without Regret is undone by some frankly awful songwriting. ... Still, Caldwell does her damndest to sell the terrible material with conviction and sincerity. Her voice is actually interesting: Her husky alto has a heavy rasp, and she displays quite a bit of power in her lower register."

Singles 
"Mess of You" was released as the first single on Caldwell's official website and MySpace page on December 17, 2009.

"Desperate Girls & Stupid Boys" was the second single released on December 3, 2010, which led to Caldwell to push back the release of the album to its current release date. The song debuted at number 30 on Billboards Hot Dance Club Play Chart.
"Naked" was released as the third single in 2011.

Track listing

Personnel 
Credits for Without Regret adapted from AllMusic.

Marshall Altman – arranger, percussion, producer, programming, string arrangements, background vocals
Adam Ayan – mastering
John Baxter – vocal producer
Matt Beard – photography
Kimberly Caldwell – vocals
Michael Chaves – additional production, acoustic and electric guitars
Angelica Cob–Baehler – creative director
Justin Cortelyou – engineer, vocal editing
Richard Dodd – mastering
Andy Grush – keyboards
Tommy Henriksen – bass, engineer, guitar, keyboards, mixing, percussion, piano, producer, programming, synthesizer
Sean Hurley – bass
Izler – electric guitar
Allison Kaplan – background vocals
Tim Lauer – keyboards, synthesizer
MachoPsycho – producer, synthesizer
Jon Maddux – engineer
Steven Melrose – A&R
Ari Michelson – photography
Jamie Muhoberac – bass, keyboards, piano
Daniel Piscina – assistant engineer, digital editing
Keely Hawkes Pressly – background vocals
Zac Rae – effects, Fender Rhodes, noise, organ (Hammond), piano, synthesizer, Wurlitzer
Eric Robinson – additional production, engineer, mixing
Jason Roller – acoustic guitar
John-Mark Baxter Seltzer – guitar, piano, producer, vocal producer, background vocals
Carrie Smith – art direction, design, package design
Chris Steffen – assistant engineer
Aaron Sterling – drums, percussion
Joe Zook – additional production, mixing

Charts

References 

2011 debut albums
Albums produced by Marshall Altman
Kimberly Caldwell albums